Raeth is a Pakistani Sufi rock band. The band, which currently has two members, follows in the footsteps of other Pakistani, and Pakistani-American groups such as Junoon, Strings, and Jal. They have garnered a significant fan base in both Pakistan and India.

The band can be found on Twitter, Facebook, and Vimeo, while their music is available on streaming services such as YouTube, Last.fm, Apple Music, and Google Play.

Background 
Raeth was initially formed in 2006 by four students from Karachi, Pakistan — Wajhi Farooki (vocals), Mustafa Asad (bass), and Hasan Farabi (lead guitar). The band was launched in 2006 by Fire Records at a local beach club in DHA.

"Bhula Do," a single from their debut album Raeth, was ranked among the top four best-selling audio releases in Pakistan, and became the number one on MTV Top Charts next to Kailash Kher's "Saaiyan" in 2014. The album itself made it to No 7 on the Indian Planet M charts. In 2006, Raeth was also featured on MTV India and Channel V as an up-and-coming new group.

Other Work 
In 2013, Raeth worked alongside musical director Chirantan Bhatt on the remake of Indian action film Zanjeer, starring Priyanka Chopra.

In April 2020, Raeth lead singer Wajhi Farooki organized the online Anti-Corona Indo-Pak Concert, which he and two other artists—Bangladeshi folk singer Indira Majumdar and Kolkata-based Kinjal Bhattacharya—livestreamed an hour-long jam session on Instagram.

Members 
Original:

 Wajhi Farouqui – lead vocals
 Hasan Farabi – lead guitar
 Mustafa Asad – bass

2018 newcomers:

 Sanjeet Mothey
 Shikhar Sharma
 Tarun Sharma

Discography

Debut Album: Raeth

EPs & Singles

References 

2006 establishments in Pakistan
Musical groups established in 2006
Musical groups from Karachi